Agathangelus, (1769 – 1832) was the leader of the Metropolitanate of Belgrade from 1815 until 1825 when recalled back to Constantinople. There he was elected Ecumenical Patriarch of Constantinople during the period 1826–1830.

Biography
He was born in a village near Edirne, which helped accuse him of being of Bulgarian descent. There he was first educated. He became a monk in the Iviron Monastery of Mount Athos. About 1800 he became a priest of the Greek community of Moscow. In November 1815 he was elected Metropolitan bishop of Belgrade and in August 1825 metropolitan bishop of Chalcedon. On 26 September in 1826, after Chrystanthus was deposed and exiled, Agathangelus was elected Patriarch of Constantinople.

He was one of the most educated Patriarchs of his time. He spoke Greek, Turkish, Bulgarian, Russian and French. His reign was associated with certain actions that lowered his prestige and caused heated reactions. The first was his involvement in the Greek War of Independence in 1827 when some of the chieftains of Central Greece asked for his intercession with Sultan Mahmud II so that they would be amnestied. Agathangelus, on the Sultan's order, sent a deputation to the Ioannis Kapodistrias, asking that the Greeks submit to the Sultan, an act which tainted his reputation as anti-ethnic. Along with his involvement in the election of the Patriarch of Jerusalem, which was attributed to bribery, economical and administrative instabilities led to his deposition on 5 July 1830.

After that, he was exiled to Kayseri and later to Edirne, where he died in 1832.

References

Sources 

 
 
 
 Οικουμενικό Πατριαρχείο
 Encyclopedia Papyrus Larousse Britannica, 2007, vol. 1, p. 152

1832 deaths
People from Edirne
19th-century Ecumenical Patriarchs of Constantinople
Metropolitans of Belgrade
Greek people of the Greek War of Independence
Bishops of Chalcedon
1769 births
People associated with Iviron Monastery